Ledbury railway station is a railway station on the outskirts of the town of Ledbury on the Worcester to Hereford line in the English Midlands. It has regular services to Birmingham plus several direct trains a day to London Paddington.

History 

The line was originally built by the West Midland Railway who opened Ledbury station on 15 September 1861. A branch line from Ledbury to Gloucester, via Dymock and Newent opened in July 1885 for which a new signal box was opened at Ledbury replacing one or perhaps two earlier signal boxes and controlling a small engine shed on the north side of the station and a goods yard on the south.

The Newent branch was closed in 1959, and the goods yard and engine shed closed in 1965, leaving just the station itself.  The modern station comprises two platforms with waiting shelters and car parking facilities, the station is unusual in having a privately run ticket office located in a wooden chalet by the entrance.

Stationmasters
The station master's house is on the approach to the station forecourt and is Grade II listed.

Frederick Corran Barrett 1863 - 1864  (afterwards station master at Abergavenny)
John Watkins 1864 - 1876 (formerly station master at Tredegar Junction)
Charles Cox 1876 - 1878 (formerly station master at Marlborough, afterwards station master at Banbury)
Arthur William Perks 1879 - 1882
Richard Roberts 1884 - 1897  (afterwards station master at Stroud)
Thomas Bailey 1899 - ca. 1911
George W. Lane 1924 - 1932 (formerly station master at Hartlebury)
Percy William Tow 1932 - ca. 1938 (formerly station master at Henwick)
Frederick William Peachey ca. 1939
C.T. Richards ca. 1953

Today 
Following the singling of the double track between Hereford and Ledbury in 1984, the station area bears the only section of double track, where trains travelling in opposite directions can pass each other, between Shelwick Junction, near Hereford and the East portal of Colwall New Tunnel beneath the Malvern Hills at the former Malvern Wells station and near to Great Malvern.

The single-track Ledbury Tunnel, immediately to the east of the station, was notorious among steam locomotive crews for its bad atmosphere, the result of its unusually narrow bore combined with a steep gradient and a curve at the north end.

The station was featured in episode six of the second series of Great British Railway Journeys broadcast on 10 January 2011, in which Michael Portillo travels from Ledbury to Shrewsbury.

Services
Ledbury has a passenger service every day except Christmas Day and Boxing Day (25 and 26 December). Monday to Saturday this service comprises typically one train per hour in each direction between Birmingham New Street and Hereford, with extra trains in the morning and evening peaks on weekdays. Some early morning and late evening trains start/terminate at Worcester Shrub Hill instead of Birmingham New Street. This service is reduced to a 2-hourly service on Sundays. These trains are operated by West Midlands Trains, which took over from London Midland on 10 December 2017.

Trains between Hereford and London Paddington also call at Ledbury. Monday to Friday, there are six services eastbound to Paddington, and five westbound. This is reduced to five eastbound and four westbound on Saturdays and four eastbound and five westbound trains on Sundays. All trains to London are operated by Great Western Railway.

References

Further reading

External links

 Ledbury Station Heritage Website - The independent ticket office website between 1993 and 2019
 Cotswold Line Promotion Group

Railway stations in Herefordshire
DfT Category E stations
Former Great Western Railway stations
Railway stations in Great Britain opened in 1861
Railway stations served by Great Western Railway
Railway stations served by West Midlands Trains
1861 establishments in England
Ledbury